General elections were held in Sark on 8 December 2010, the second elections held on the island under the 2008 Constitution. The elections were for 14 of the seats that had been elected in the 2008 elections, for a four-year term.

Twenty-one candidates contested the elections.

Background 
On 16 January and 21 February 2008, the Chief Pleas approved a law which introduces a 30-member chamber, with 28 elected members and two unelected members. On 9 April 2008 the Privy Council approved the Sark law reforms. The first election held in Sark under the 2008 Constitution took place on 10 December 2008, and the new chamber convened for the first time on 21 January 2009.

Electoral system
The first election held in Sark under the 2008 Constitution took place on 10 December 2008. In total, 28 Conseillers were to be elected via plurality block voting from 57 candidates, with the latter figure representing about 12% of the electorate in the island. A recount was ordered as several of the candidates for the last seat were separated by only a few votes.

Results
The elections reflected the "Sark chasm" throughout the island between those who support the traditional system and those who support further reforms. The second elections did not attract similar worldwide media coverage as the first, described as 'business as usual' by local media.

References

External links 
 Sark Government
 Election Results

Sark
Elections in Sark
2010 in Guernsey
December 2010 events in Europe